Tamara Samandeepika (born 4 July 1974) is a Sri Lankan sprinter. She competed in the women's 4 × 100 metres relay at the 2000 Summer Olympics.

References

External links
 

1974 births
Living people
Athletes (track and field) at the 2000 Summer Olympics
Sri Lankan female sprinters
Olympic athletes of Sri Lanka
Place of birth missing (living people)
Olympic female sprinters